Valentin Nikolayev may refer to:

 Valentin Nikolayev (figure skater), Soviet figure skating coach for Oksana Baiul
 Valentin Nikolayev (footballer), Soviet international footballer and national team manager
 Valentin Nikolayev (wrestler), Soviet Greco-Roman wrestler, Olympic champion in 1956